Aguiguan (also Aguigan and Aguihan, based on the Spanish rendition of the native name, Aguijan, which is still used) is a small bean-shaped coralline island in the Northern Mariana Islands chain in the Pacific Ocean. Aguiguan and neighboring Tinian Island together form Tinian Municipality, one of the four main political divisions that comprise the Northern Marianas.

History

It is likely that first sighting by Europeans occurred during the Spanish expedition of Ferdinand Magellan, or by its continuation by Gonzalo Gómez de Espinosa being charted as Santo Ángel. It was visited by the Spanish missionary Diego Luis de San Vitores in 1669.

Aguiguan was administered as part of the Spanish Mariana Islands from the 16th century to 1899, when the Northern Marianas were sold by Spain to the German Empire. Under Germany, it was administered as part of German New Guinea. During World War I, Aguiguan came under the control of the Empire of Japan and was administered as part of the South Seas Mandate. During World War II, the Imperial Japanese Army maintained a garrison on Aguiguan. This garrison is noteworthy because of its surrender to Allied forces September 4, 1945, two days after the surrender of Japan. The surrender was unique as it was the only surrender hosted by a U.S. Coast Guard Cutter, the USCG 83525. US Navy Admiral Marshall R. Greer received the surrender of the Japanese Second Lieutenant Kinichi Yamada.

Following World War II, Aguiguan came under the control of the United States and was administered as part of the Trust Territory of the Pacific Islands. Since 1978, the island has been part of the Commonwealth of the Northern Mariana Islands.

Geography

It is nicknamed “Goat Island” due to the large number of feral goats present there. Much of the native vegetation on Aguigan has been destroyed by goats.

Aguiguan is uninhabited and is seldom visited because it is surrounded by sheer steep cliffs. However, a 2002 survey of the island did find a handful of native species there, including the Mariana fruit bat, the Polynesian sheath-tailed bat and the Micronesian megapode Megapodius laperouse.

Naftan Rock

Important Bird Area
Aguiguan and Naftan Rock have been recognised as an Important Bird Area (IBA) by BirdLife International because they support populations of Micronesian megapodes, white-throated ground doves, Mariana fruit doves, Mariana swiftlets, Micronesian myzomelas, rufous fantails, Aguiguan reed warblers, golden and Saipan white-eyes, and Micronesian starlings. Aguiguan also supports seabird breeding colonies, with 120 pairs of brown boobies and 450 pairs of brown noddies reported, while Naftan Rock is home to several thousand seabirds.

See also
Tinian Naval Base

References
 Russell E. Brainard et al.: Coral reef ecosystem monitoring report of the Mariana Archipelago: 2003–2007, NOAA Fisheries, Pacific Islands Fisheries Science Center (2012).

References

External links 

 U.S. Coast Guard Historian's Office, Daily Chronology of Coast Guard History (Entry for 4 September)
 archive
 Pascal Horst Lehne and Christoph Gäbler: Über die Marianen. Lehne-Verlag, Wohldorf in Germany 1972. and Aguijan
 Google: Aguijan
From the website https://web.archive.org/web/20110728145947/http://www.uscg83footers.org/new_page_8.htm - Vessel corrected to be the Coast Guard Cutter 83525 Researched by Larry Richter, USCG Ret

Former German colonies
Islands of the Northern Mariana Islands
Coral islands
Uninhabited islands of the Northern Mariana Islands
Important Bird Areas of the Northern Mariana Islands
Seabird colonies